Psallovius is a genus of plant bugs in the family Miridae. There are about five described species in Psallovius.

Species
These five species belong to the genus Psallovius:
 Psallovius dimorphicus Schwartz & Schuh, 1999
 Psallovius flaviclavus (Knight, 1930)
 Psallovius nigroantennatus Schwartz & Schuh, 1999
 Psallovius piceicola (Knight, 1923)
 Psallovius rubrofemoratus (Knight, 1930)

References

Further reading

 
 
 
 

Phylini
Articles created by Qbugbot